Acheilognathus tabira tabira is a subspecies of Acheilognathus tabira.

References

Acheilognathus
Taxa named by David Starr Jordan